Mount Guanyin may refer to:
 Mount Guanyin (Dongguan), in China.
 Mount Guanyin (New Taipei), in Taiwan.

See also
Buddha Mountain, 2010 Chinese film whose Chinese name is translated to "Mount Guanyin"
Gwaneumsan, a mountain in Pocheon, Gyeonggi, South Korea